Pundaloya is a small town located in Sri Lanka, between the Kothmale and Nuwara Eliya Districts within the country's Central Province. The town is located adjacent to the Pundaloya River and Highway B412.

See also
List of towns in Central Province, Sri Lanka

References

External links

Populated places in Nuwara Eliya District